The Nakhimov Naval School or Nakhimov School is a form of military education for teenagers  introduced in the Soviet Union and once also located in other cities. They are named after Imperial Russian admiral Pavel Nakhimov.

History 
The first Nakhimov School was introduced in Tbilisi in 1943 during the Great Patriotic War, for sons of military personnel who died in action. The Tbilisi Nakhimov Naval School existed between 1943 and 1955. In 1944 the Leningrad Nakhimov Naval School opened. The Riga Nakhimov Naval School existed during 1945-1953.

Today in Russia, only the St. Petersburg Nakhimov School continues to exist. The school today offers teenage boys preparation for service as officers in the Russian Navy, secondary education, and military-style training in national naval traditions. As of 2017, the school has branches in Vladivostok, Murmansk and Sevastopol, with schools being located in all four fleets of Russia. Plans for a branch in Dagestan, connected with the Caspian Flotilla, were announced in 2018. On 13 August 2019 Defence Minister Sergey Shoygu laid the foundation stone for a new branch of the school in Kaliningrad, due to open in September 2020.

School culture

Today, all Nakhimov schools have the traditional honor of opening all Victory Day Parades in their local city with their corps of drums. It also participated in the now defunct October Revolution Day parades. In 2015 Major General Timur Apakidze, a Soviet naval aviation pioneer who had died in a flying accident in 2001, was added to the rolls of the Nakhimov Naval School in perpetuity. The general service march of the schools is the March of Nakhimovtsev (Марш Нахимовцев), written by Vasily Solovyov-Sedoi in 1949. Students at the Nakhimov Naval School and its graduates are known as "Nakhimovites".

List of current schools

Former schools

Riga Nakhimov Naval School
The Riga Nakhimov Naval School existed from 1945 to 1953 in the capital Latvian SSR, operating from the building that is now the Latvian War Museum throughout its 8 year existence. A notable alumni of the school included Afro-Russian actor and poet James Lloydovich Patterson.

Tbilisi Nakhimov Naval School 
The Tbilisi Nakhimov Naval School was created by order of the People's Commissar of the Navy Nikolai Kuznetsov on 16 October 1943. It was the first Nakhimov school to be founded in the USSR. Being located in the Georgian Soviet Socialist Republic, it was one of two schools to b located outside of the RSFSR. It was disbanded in 1955. Among its notable alumni is Yuri Pivnev, the longtime head of the Leningrad DOSAAF.

See also
 Suvorov Military School
 Cantonist

References

http://nvmu.edumil.ru/

Nakhimov Naval School
Military education and training in Russia
Military education and training in the Soviet Union
Military high schools
Soviet Navy
Russian Navy